KEdit  may refer to:

KEDIT, a visual editor for DOS and Windows, a clone of XEDIT
KEdit, a simple text editor for KDE